Kachel is a German surname meaning "tile". Notable people with the surname include:

Chris Kachel (born 1955), Australian former professional tennis player
Józef Kachel (1913–1983), Polish Boy Scouts scoutmaster and politician
Marie Kachel Bucher (1909–2008), American schoolteacher and last surviving resident member of the German Seventh-Day Baptists religious community of the Ephrata Cloister

German-language surnames